Dan (or Halfdan) is the name of one or more legendary earliest kings of the Danes and Denmark, mentioned in medieval Scandinavian texts.

The Lejre Chronicle
The Chronicle of Lejre (Chronicon Lethrense) written about 1170 introduces a primeval King Ypper of Uppsala whose three sons were Dan, who afterwards ruled Denmark, Nori, who afterwards ruled Norway, and Østen, who afterwards ruled the Swedes. Dan apparently first ruled in Zealand for the Chronicle states that it was when Dan had saved his people from an attack by the Emperor Augustus that the Jutes and the men of Fyn and Scania also accepted him as king, whence the resultant expanded country of Denmark was named after him. Dan's wife was named Dana and his son was named Ro.

The Rígsthula   
The Eddic poem Rígsthula, tells how the god Ríg (said to be Heimdall), fathered a mortal son named Jarl. Jarl had twelve sons with Erna Herse's daughter, the youngest of which bore the name Kon the Young (Old Norse Konr Ungr), this name understood to be the origin of the title konungr 'king', though the etymology is in fact untenable. One day, as he was hunting and snaring birds in the forest, a crow spoke to him and suggested he would gain more by going after men, and praised the wealth of "Dan and Danp". The poem breaks off incomplete at that point.

The Skjöldungasaga
According to Arngrímur Jónsson's Latin epitome of the lost Skjöldungasaga made in 1597:

Ríg (Rigus) was a man not the least among the great ones of his time. He married the daughter of a certain Danp [Old Norse Danpr], lord of Danpsted, whose name was Dana; and later, having won the royal title for his province, left as his heir his son by Dana, called Dan or Danum, all of whose subjects were called Danes.

This tradition is close to that of the Rígsthula.

This Dan married Olof the daughter of Wermund and so became brother-in-law to the Offa of Angel mentioned in the Old English poem Beowulf. Dan ruled first in Jutland but then conquered Zealand from King Aleif creating the kingdom of Denmark.

Ynglinga saga
Snorri Sturluson's Ynglinga saga relates of King Dygvi of Sweden:

Dygvi's mother was Drótt, a daughter of King Danp, the son of Ríg, who was first called konungr ['king'] in the Danish tongue [(Old Norse)]. His descendants always afterwards considered the title of konungr the title of highest dignity. Dygvi was the first of his family to be called konungr, for his predecessors had been called dróttinn ['chieftain'], and their wives dróttning, and their court drótt ['war band']. Each of their race was called Yngvi, or Ynguni, and the whole race together Ynglingar. Queen Drótt was a sister of King Dan Mikilláti, from whom Denmark took its name.

Here Ríg is the father of Danp, the father of Dan. The title Mikilláti can be translated 'Magnificent' or 'Proud'.

Snorri does not relate here whether this Dan is also descended from King Fridfrodi or Peace-Fróði whom Snorri presented as ruling in Zealand as a contemporary of Fjölnir son of Frey six generations before King Dygvi. Snorri writes further:

In the time when the kings we have been speaking of were in Uppsala, Denmark had been ruled over by Dan Mikilláti, who lived to a very great age; then by his son, Fróði Mikilláti, or the Peace-loving, who was succeeded by his sons Halfdan and Fridleif, who were great warriors.

This peaceful Fróði seems a duplicate of the earlier Fróði.

In his preface to the Heimskringla (which includes the Ynglinga saga), Snorri writes:

The Age of Cairns began properly in Denmark after Dan Mikilláti had raised for himself a burial cairn, and ordered that he should be buried in it on his death, with his royal ornaments and armour, his horse and saddle-furniture, and other valuable goods; and many of his descendants followed his example.  But the burning of the dead continued, long after that time, to be the custom of the Swedes and Northmen.

Sven Aagesen
The 12th century historian Sven Aagesen mentions Danu Elatus 'the Proud' presumably, Dan Mikilláti, and makes him the successor to Uffi, that is to Offa son of Wermund, so agreeing with the Skjöldungasaga. He said that this Dan was so powerful a king that he had another king as his page and two nobles to hold his horse.

The Gesta Danorum

Saxo Grammaticus in his Gesta Danorum presents three different Danish monarchs named Dan, either splitting up a single monarch into many or properly keeping separate what others have confused.

Saxo begins his history with two brothers named Dan and Angul, sons of one Humbli, who were made rulers by the consent of the people because of their bravery. They were not however called "kings", as that usage was not then common.

Angul is the eponym of the region of Angul and from his people eventually came the English who gave their name to England. Dan fathered two sons, Humblus and Lotherus, by his wife Grytha.

Neither one is otherwise known, though a king named Humli is a leader of Huns in the Old Norse Battle of the Goths and Huns. Lotherus might have some relation to the Norse god Lóðurr or to the exiled king Heremod mentioned in Beowulf or to both. According to Saxo, Lotherus is the father of the famous hero Skioldus.

The second king called Dan appears much later in Book 4, as the son of Uffi son of Vermund, (that is Offa of Angel son of Wermund). But Saxo passes over him in a few lines as a warlike king who scorned his subjects and wasted his wealth, much degenerated from his ancestors.

He is followed by King Huglek, then Fróði the Active, who is then followed by the third Dan. Saxo does not specifically give the parentage of any of these kings. Of this Dan, Saxo relates only an anecdote that when Dan was twelve years old, tired of the arrogance of Saxon ambassadors who demanded tribute on pain of war, he bridged the river Elbe with ships, crossed over, and won a great victory.

This Dan is the father of Fridlef father of Frothi, in whom one recognizes Fridleif and his son Fróði mentioned often in Norse sources, the latter being, at least by parentage, the Peace-Fróði whom Snorri introduced in the early in the Ynglinga saga.

The Song of Eric
The "Song of Eric" was once seen as a valuable source for Migration Period history, but is now regarded as inauthentic fakelore created during the 16th century.

The ballad deals with Eric, the first king of Geatland (fyrsti konunger i Götalandinu vidha). He sent a troop of Geats southward to a country named Vetala, where no one had yet cultivated the land. In their company was a wise man who was to uphold the law. Finally, a king named Humli set his son Dan to rule the settlers, and after Dan, Vetala was named  Denmark.

The song was first published in a Latin translation in Johannes Magnus' Historia de omnibus gothorum sueonumque regibus (1554). He states that the original song was widely sung in Sweden at the time.

See also
 Dan I of Denmark
 Angul

References

Mythological kings of Denmark